Lightship is a book by Jim Burns and Chris Evans published in 1985.

Plot summary
Lightship is a book of 120 color paintings by Jim Burns.

Reception
Dave Langford reviewed Lightship for White Dwarf #80, and stated that "classy colour paintings by our very own Jim Burns, who has either a spherical-breasted model or an enthusiastic imagination."

Reviews
Review by Chris Morgan (1986) in Fantasy Review, June 1986.
Review by Dan Chow (1986) in Locus, #306 July 1986.

References

Books about visual art